Carlton River is a locality and small rural community in the local government area of Sorell, in the Sorell and surrounds region of Tasmania. The shore of Flinders Channel forms part of the southern boundary. The 2016 census determined a population of 265 for the state suburb of Carlton River.

History
The locality is likely named for the stream Carlton River that passes through it from north-east to south-west.

Road infrastructure
The C349 route (Sugarloaf Road) runs south from the Arthur Highway through the locality, providing access to Primrose Sands. The C334 route (Carlton River Road) passes through the locality from west to east.

References

East Coast Tasmania
Towns in Tasmania
Localities of Sorell Council